Capon Springs Station was an unincorporated community hamlet in Hampshire County in the U.S. state of West Virginia centered on a station on the Winchester and Western Railroad. Located along Capon Springs Road (West Virginia Secondary Route 16) where Dry Run meets Capon Springs Run on the western end of Middle Ridge, Capon Springs Station served as a stop for guests at the Capon Springs Resort in Capon Springs and people picnicking at Capon Lake on the Cacapon River.

References 

Unincorporated communities in Hampshire County, West Virginia
Unincorporated communities in West Virginia